Brytni Melicia Sarpy (born September 21, 1987) is an American actress best known for her portrayal of Valerie Spencer on the ABC network soap opera General Hospital.

Early life
Sarpy was born on September 21, 1987, in California. Her father is Mel Sarpy and her mother's name is Kim. For most of her childhood, Sarpy lived in Sherman Oaks and attended high school in Upland. Sarpy attended the University of California, Santa Barbara and graduated in 2008 with a Bachelor of Fine Arts degree. Sarpy began auditioning for professional gigs and upon graduation worked several jobs to stay afloat. She worked as a bartender, a personal trainer at Equinox Fitness, and also did commercial work as an athletic print model.

Career
Sarpy started in theater where she appeared in several main stage and local productions where she received critical acclaim for her dramatic range and comedic timing. Brytni is also a trained dancer. The actress currently resides in Los Angeles where she is represented by Pantheon Agency for theater and Vision Talent and CESD for commercial and print work. She has appeared in commercials and print work for Nike, Yahoo!, AT&T, New Balance, and several others. In 2010, Sarpy starred alongside Jamie Lee Curtis and Sigourney Weaver in You Again. In addition to auditioning for the NBC soap opera, Days of Our Lives, Sarpy had previously auditioned for the General Hospital roles of Taylor DuBois and later Jordan Ashford for which she was too old and too young, respectively. Sarpy later won the contract role of Valerie Spencer made her debut on March 20, 2015. In March 2016, it was announced that Sarpy was set to host the a new reality series The Pitch Room. In December 2016, Sarpy was dropped from a series regular to recurring status at General Hospital. In 2017, Sarpy starred alongside Heather Langenkamp in Truth or Dare. She was cast in the regular role of Elena Dawson on The Young and the Restless in February 2019. In March 2019, Sarpy announced that she'd also booked a recurring role on the new season of The Haves and the Have Nots.

Personal life
Sarpy's parents split when she was about 6 years old and Sarpy was primarily raised by her father. Sarpy is very close with her father, who suffers from Parkinson's disease. She has a younger half brother, Aiden through her father. Sarpy also has two other half brothers and a half sister on her mother's side. She got a rescue dog named Charlie for her birthday in 2012. Sarpy is also a pescatarian. She has opened up about her anxiety and depression on World Mental Health Day, October 10, 2018.

Sarpy began dating her co-star Bryton James in May 2019.

Filmography

Film

Television

Theater

References

External links
 Brytni Sarpy Official website
 
 

1987 births
Actresses from California
American people of Creole descent
American people of Apache descent
American people of Filipino descent
American people who self-identify as being of Native American descent
American soap opera actresses
American television actresses
Living people
People from Sherman Oaks, Los Angeles
University of California, Santa Barbara alumni
21st-century American women